{{DISPLAYTITLE:C13H19NO2}}
The molecular formula C13H19NO2 (molar mass : 221.30 g/mol) may refer to:

 Dioscorine
 Ethylbenzodioxolylbutanamine
 F-2 (psychedelic)
 Ibuproxam
 Ifoxetine
 Methylbenzodioxolylpentanamine
 Methylenedioxyisopropylamphetamine
 Methylenedioxypropylamphetamine
 PF-219,061